The 83rd Emperor's Cup Statistics of Emperor's Cup in the 2003 season.

Overview
It was contested by 80 teams, and Júbilo Iwata won the cup for the first time.

Results

First round
Hannan University 2–0 Wakayama Kihoku Shukyudan
Funabashi Municipal High School 1–0 Thespa Kusatsu
Kanazawa 4–1 Yamaguchi Teachers
Sanfrecce Hiroshima 1–0 Kwansei Gakuin University
Omiya Ardija 5–0 Matsuzaka University
Tochigi SC 5–2 Aomori Yamada High School
Avispa Fukuoka 7–0 Tokai University
Maruyasu Okazaki 1–0 Kibi International University
Okinawa Kariyushi 1–0 Sagan Tosu
ALO's Hokuriku 3–2 Doto University
Consadole Sapporo 4–0 Jinsei Gakuen High School
Shizuoka Sangyo University 4–2 Shiga Yasu High School
Montedio Yamagata 4–3 Gifu Technical High School
Ritsumeikan University 4–1 Tsuruoka Higashi High School
Honda FC 5–0 Nirasaki Astros
Tsukuba University 5–0 Matsucho Gakuen High School
Otsuka Pharmaceuticals 5–0 Iwami FC
TDK 3–1 Alouette Kumamoto
Kawasaki Frontale 2–0 Juntendo University
Kunimi High School 4–0 Panasonic Energy Tokushima
Mito HollyHock 1–0 Sanfrecce Hiroshima Youth
Gainare Tottori 1–0 Nippon Bunri University
Shonan Bellmare 6–1 Tenri University
Ehime FC 4–1 Japan Soccer College
Yokohama 8–1 Viancone Fukushima
Fukuoka University of Education 1–1(PK 6–5) Sony Sendai
Ventforet Kofu 3–0 Fukui University of Technology
Momoyama Gakuin University 6–1 Profesor Miyazaki
Albirex Niigata 5–0 Volca Kagoshima
Kochi University 3–1 Morioka Zebra
Honda Luminoso Sayama 1–0 Komazawa University
Sagawa Express Tokyo 4–0 Kyushu INAX

Second round
Funabashi Municipal High School 1–0 Hannan University
Kawasaki Frontale 7–1 Kunimi High School
Honda FC 2–1 Tsukuba University
Avispa Fukuoka 3–0 Maruyasu Okazaki
Yokohama 5–0 Fukuoka University of Education
Albirex Niigata 2–0 Kochi University
Omiya Ardija 4–0 Tochigi SC
Shonan Bellmare 2–1 Ehime FC
Mito HollyHock 4–1 Gainare Tottori
Sanfrecce Hiroshima 3–0 Kanazawa
ALO's Hokuriku 2–1 Okinawa Kariyushi
Consadole Sapporo 3–2 Shizuoka Sangyo University
Montedio Yamagata 6–1 Ritsumeikan University
Sagawa Express Tokyo 2–1 Honda Luminoso Sayama
Otsuka Pharmaceuticals 6–0 TDK
Ventforet Kofu 2–1 Momoyama Gakuin University

Third round
Yokohama F. Marinos 2–2(PK 4–1) Funabashi Municipal High School
Gamba Osaka 3–1 Consadole Sapporo
Júbilo Iwata 2–0 Sagawa Express Tokyo
Tokyo Verdy 2–1 Ventforet Kofu
Cerezo Osaka 4–1 ALO's Hokuriku
Nagoya Grampus Eight 1–0 Yokohama
Kashiwa Reysol 1–0 Omiya Ardija
Sanfrecce Hiroshima 2–0 Kyoto Purple Sanga
Shimizu S-Pulse 2–0 Mito HollyHock
Kashima Antlers 3–2 Avispa Fukuoka
Kawasaki Frontale 3–0 Oita Trinita
Albirex Niigata 2–1 Vegalta Sendai
JEF United Ichihara 5–0 Otsuka Pharmaceuticals
Shonan Bellmare 2–1 Urawa Red Diamonds
Vissel Kobe 3–0 Montedio Yamagata
Tokyo 2–2 Honda FC

Fourth round
Kashima Antlers 3–2 Kashiwa Reysol
Yokohama F. Marinos 2–1 Sanfrecce Hiroshima
JEF United Ichihara 5–0 Kawasaki Frontale
Júbilo Iwata 4–0 Albirex Niigata
Cerezo Osaka 3–2 Gamba Osaka
Shimizu S-Pulse 2–1 Shonan Bellmare
Vissel Kobe 2–2(PK 5–4)Tokyo
Tokyo Verdy 1–0 Nagoya Grampus Eight

Quarterfinals
Kashima Antlers 4–1 Yokohama F. Marinos
Shimizu S-Pulse 1–0 JEF United Ichihara
Cerezo Osaka 3–2 Vissel Kobe
Júbilo Iwata 3–0 Tokyo Verdy

Semifinals
Júbilo Iwata 4–2 Shimizu S-Pulse
Cerezo Osaka 2–1 Kashima Antlers

Final

Júbilo Iwata 1–0 Cerezo Osaka
Júbilo Iwata won the championship and guaranteed a place in the 2004 AFC Champions League after Kyoto Purple Sanga were relegated to Division 2.

References
 NHK

Emperor's Cup
Emp
2004 in Japanese football